A national government is the government of a nation.

National government or 
National Government may also refer to:

 Central government in a unitary state, or a country that does not give significant power to regional divisions
 Federal government, the government of a federal state, or a country that gives significant power to regional divisions
 National unity government, an all-party coalition government, usually formed during a time of war or other national emergency

Specific governments 
 Governments of the Republic of China
 National Government of the Republic of China, from 1925 to 1948
 Reorganized National Government of the Republic of China, from 1940 to 1945
 National Government (Canada), the name of the historic Conservative Party of Canada c. 1940
 National Government (United Kingdom), the British government from 1931 to 1940
 New Zealand National Party governments
 First National Government of New Zealand, the New Zealand government led by Sidney Holland from 1949 to 1957
 Second National Government of New Zealand, the New Zealand government led by Keith Holyoake from 1960 to 1972
 Third National Government of New Zealand, the New Zealand government led by Robert Muldoon from 1975 to 1984
 Fourth National Government of New Zealand, the New Zealand government led by Jim Bolger and Jenny Shipley respectively from 1990 to 1999
 Fifth National Government of New Zealand, the New Zealand government led by John Key and Bill English respectively from 2008 to 2017
 Polish National Government (disambiguation)
 Provisional National Government of the Southwestern Caucasus, a provisional government based in Kars, Turkey
 Transitional National Government, the Somali government from 2000 to 2004
 Tsilhqot'in National Government, an indigenous government in British Columbia, Canada
 Ukrainian national government (1941)

See also
 
 National Government Parks, Japan